This is a  list of politicians who also worked as actors and vice versa:

North America

United States

Mexico

Central and South America

Brazil

Argentina

Guatemala

Panama

Europe

Russia

United Kingdom

Asia

India

Japan

Philippines

Sri Lanka

Thailand

Oceania

Australia

New Zealand

See also
List of sportsperson-politicians

Notes

References

Politicians
Actor-politicians
List